Ten Ways (formerly Ten Ways from Sunday) is a Canadian progressive rock band formed in Port Coquitlam, British Columbia in 2001, and based in nearby Coquitlam. The band was selected as one of five British Columbian bands to perform on CBC Television's Great Canadian Music Dream event in January 2003. Their song "You've Been Around" was featured in EA Sports' video game NHL 2004 and was selected for CFOX's 2003 Vancouver Seeds compilation. The band has independently released two EPs, What I Wanted (produced by Tom Baker, 2003) and Ten Ways from Sunday (produced by Devin Townsend, 2005). They independently released their debut album The Solution on iTunes in May 2010 and have since been inactive.

Discography

Studio albums
 The Solution (2010)

EPs
 What I Wanted (EP, self-released, 2003)
 Ten Ways from Sunday (EP, self-released, 2005)

Members
 Eric Severinson – vocals (2008–present)
 Mike Young – bass (2001–present)
 Dave Young – guitar (2001–present)
 Ryan Van Poederooyen – drums (2008–present)

Former members
 Jeff Johnson – guitar, vocals (2001–2004)
 Matt Layzell – vocals (2001–2008)
 Travis Robson – drums (2001–2008)

References

Additional references

 Newton, Steve (June 16, 2005). "Ten Ways from Sunday." The Georgia Straight.
 Blechschmidt, Ian (2006). "Ten Ways from Sunday Interview." Indiesoundz.
 "The Devin Townsend Band / Terror Syndrome Members Launch Ten Ways from Sunday" (May 10, 2008). Blabbermouth.net.

External links
Official website

Canadian progressive rock groups
Musical groups from British Columbia
Port Coquitlam
Musical groups established in 2001
Musical groups disestablished in 2010
2001 establishments in British Columbia
2010 disestablishments in British Columbia